Mirko Giacobbe (born 26 July 1992) is an Italian footballer who plays as a midfielder for Serie D club Albalonga.

Career

Legnago Salus
In December 2019, Giacobbe joined Serie D club Legnago Salus.

References

External links

1992 births
Living people
People from San Giorgio a Cremano
Footballers from Campania
Italian footballers
Association football midfielders
Serie B players
Serie C players
Serie D players
A.S.D. Portogruaro players
Bassano Virtus 55 S.T. players
U.S. Castrovillari Calcio players
A.S.D. Nerostellati Frattese players
S.F. Aversa Normanna players
S.S.D. Città di Campobasso players
A.C. Savoia 1908 players
F.C. Legnago Salus players